Tainan County was a county in southern Taiwan between 1945 and 2010. The county seat was in Sinying City.

History
Tainan County was established on 7 January 1946 on the territory of Tainan Prefecture shortly after the end of World War II. In the early years, Tainan County consists of most territory of Tainan Prefecture except the territory near cities of Tainan and Kagi (Chiayi). The county is subdivide into districts, which is reformed from Japanese districts. The districts are divided into townships.

On 16 August 1950, another division reform was implemented. The northern part of the county was separated and established Chiayi County and Yunlin County. The remaining Tainan County has territory equivalent to the Shin'ei (Hsinying), Niitoyo (Hsinfeng), Shinka (Hsinhua), Sobun (Tsengwen), and Hokumon (Peimen) in the Japanese era. In addition, districts in the remaining part of Kaohsiung County was defunct. All townships were directly controlled by the County Government. On 25 December 2010, the county merged with Tainan City to form a larger single special municipality.

Administrative divisions 
The subdivisions of the County remains mostly stable between 1950 and 2010. However, some changed has also been made.
 10 Mar 1946, Anshun was merged into Tainan City and reformed from a rural township to a district.
 2 Feb 1968, Hsuehchia reformed from a rural township to an urban township for its population.
 25 Dec 1981, Hsinying reformed from an urban township to a county-administered city for its position as a county seat.
 1 May 1993, Yungkang reformed from a rural township to a county-administered city for its population.
In 25 Dec 2010, The county was merged with Tainan City, all cities and townships became districts. On the eve of merging with Tainan City, the county consists of the following administrative divisions

See also
 Tainan

References

External links

 Tainan Government Website   

1946 establishments in Taiwan
2010 disestablishments in Taiwan
Former counties of Taiwan
History of Tainan